The Prader scale or Prader staging, named after Andrea Prader, is a coarse rating system for the measurement of the degree of virilization of the genitalia of the human body and is similar to the Quigley scale. It primarily relates to virilization of the female genitalia in cases of congenital adrenal hyperplasia (CAH) and identifies five distinct stages, but in recent times has been used to describe the range of differentiation of genitalia, with normal infant presentation being shown on either end of the scale, female on the left (0) and male on the right (6).

Staging 
 An infant rated at Stage 0 would be considered as having normal female external genitalia.
 Stage 1 has a mildly large clitoris and slightly reduced vaginal opening size. This degree may go unnoticed or may be simply assumed to be within normal variation.
 For Stage 2, genitalia are obviously abnormal to the eye, with a phallus intermediate in size and a small vaginal opening with separate urethral opening. Posterior labial fusion will be present.
 Stage 3 shows a further enlarged phallus, with a single urogenital sinus and almost complete fusion of the labia.
 Stage 4 looks more male than female, with an empty scrotum and a phallus the size of a normal penis, but not quite free enough of the perineum to be pulled onto the abdomen toward the umbilicus (i.e., what is termed a chordee in a male). The single small urethral/vaginal opening at the base or on the shaft of the phallus would be considered a hypospadias in a male. X-rays taken after dye injection into this opening reveal the internal connection with the upper vagina and uterus. This common opening can predispose to urinary obstruction and infection.
 Stage 5 denotes complete male virilization, with a normally formed penis with the urethral opening at or near the tip. The scrotum is normally formed but empty. The internal pelvic organs include normal ovaries and uterus, and the vagina connects internally with the urethra as in Stage 4. These infants are not visibly ambiguous are usually assumed to be ordinary boys with undescended testes. In most cases, the diagnosis of CAH is not suspected until signs of salt-wasting develop a week later.
 Stage 6 indicates normal male presentation, with no hypospadias present and normal testes.

Controversy

While the scale has been defined as a grading system for "abnormal" genitalia, the concept that atypical genitals are necessarily abnormal is contested. An opinion paper by the Swiss National Advisory Centre for Biomedical Ethics advises that "not infrequently" variations from sex norms may not be pathological or require medical treatment. Similarly, an Australian Senate Committee report on involuntary sterilization determined that research "regarding 'adequate' or 'normal' genitals, particularly for women, raises some disturbing questions", including preferences influenced by doctors' specialism and gender.

Related concepts
Numerous clinical scales and measurement systems exist to define genitals as normal male or female, or "abnormal", including the orchidometer, Quigley scale and the satirical Phall-O-Meter.

See also 
 Ambiguous genitalia
 Clitoromegaly
 Development of the reproductive system
 Intersex surgery
 Sex assignment
 Quigley scale

References

External links
 The Prader Scale - About Kids Health

Male genital procedures
Female genital procedures
Intersex and medicine